Márcio Rodrigo Trombetta (born 6 July 1980), also known as Gaúcho, is a retired Brazilian football player. He played for clubs in Brazil and Iran between 1999 and 2012.

References

1980 births
Living people
Brazilian footballers
Association football central defenders